Drew Nowak (born March 7, 1990) is a former American football center. He was signed by the Jacksonville Jaguars as an undrafted free agent in 2012. He played college football at Western Michigan.

Early years 
Nowak played high school football at De Pere High School in De Pere, Wisconsin, a suburb of Green Bay. He played mostly on the defensive line but played some center his senior year.

He attended college at Western Michigan University. Donning jersey number 92, he totalled 180 total tackles as a defensive lineman. He led the Mid-American Conference in tackles for loss and sacks his senior year.

Professional career

Jacksonville Jaguars
Nowak signed with the Jacksonville Jaguars following the 2012 NFL Draft as a rookie free agent.  He was originally signed as a defensive tackle, but due to depth at the position and injuries on the offensive line, he made the switch to offensive guard.

2012 season
Nowak spent the entire 2012 season on injured reserve.

2013 season
Nowak was released on August 30, 2013 and signed to the team's practice squad on September 1. He was promoted to the active roster on December 17.

The Jaguars released Nowak on August 29, 2014.

Seattle Seahawks

2014 season
The Seahawks signed Nowak to their practice squad September 3, 2014. On May 4, 2016, the Seahawks released Nowak.

2015 season
Nowak was named the starting center for the Seahawks in September 2015. On December 1, 2015, he was waived. On December 4, the Seahawks signed him to their practice squad.

2016 season 
On January 18, 2016, the Seahawks signed Nowak to a future/reserve contract. On May 4, 2016 Nowak was waived by the Seahawks.

Kansas City Chiefs 
On May 10, 2016, the Kansas City Chiefs signed Nowak after he was cut by the Seahawks to make room for rookies. On August 28, 2016, Nowak was waived by the Chiefs.

Personal life

Nowak grew up as a fan of his hometown Green Bay Packers, the only publicly owned NFL team, and owns three shares of the team, despite being a player for another NFL team.
Drew currently owns Freedom Green Farms in Kalkaska, Michigan where he grows medical and recreational cannabis.

References

External links
Western Michigan Broncos Bio
Jacksonville Jaguars Bio

1990 births
Living people
Sportspeople from Green Bay, Wisconsin
Players of American football from Wisconsin
Western Michigan University alumni
Western Michigan Broncos football players
American football offensive guards
American football defensive tackles
Jacksonville Jaguars players
Seattle Seahawks players
Kansas City Chiefs players